The following is the organization of the Confederate forces engaged in the Red River campaign, during the American Civil War in 1864. Order of battle shows the army organization during the campaign. The Union order of battle is listed separately.

Abbreviations used

Military rank
 LG = Lieutenant General
 MG = Major General
 BG = Brigadier General
 Col = Colonel
 Ltc = Lieutenant Colonel
 Maj = Major
 Cpt = Captain
 Lt = 1st Lieutenant

Other
 w = wounded
 mw = mortally wounded
 k = killed
 c = captured
 10pdr PR = 10-pounder Parrott rifle 
 12pdr Nap = M1857 12-pounder Napoleon
 12pdr how = M1841 12-pounder howitzer
 3.8" JR = 3.8-inch James rifle 
 30pdr PR = 30-pounder Parrott rifle
 6pdr gun = M1841 6-pounder field gun

Confederate District of West Louisiana
LG Richard Taylor

Texas and Louisiana Infantry

Detachment from Sterling Price's Army
BG Thomas James Churchill

Cavalry
BG Thomas Green

Notes
Footnotes

Citations

References
 

 
 
 

American Civil War orders of battle